The 1970 Montreal municipal election took place on October 25, 1970, to elected a mayor and city councillors in Montreal, Quebec, Canada. The election was held against the backdrop of the FLQ Crisis.

Mayor Jean Drapeau was re-elected without difficultyshutting out the oppositionist Front d'action politique (FRAP) party. The election was held during the October Crisis and Drapeau as well as federal cabinet minister Jean Marchand, accused the left-wing FRAP of being sympathetic to the Front de libération du Québec (FLQ). Support for the FRAP collapsed and Drapeau's Civic Party of Montreal won every seat on city council.

Results
Mayor

Council (incomplete)

References

1970 Quebec municipal elections
Municipal elections in Montreal
1970 in Quebec
1970s in Montreal